Cascadia Weekly was an alternative weekly newspaper based in Bellingham, Washington. Its reporting covers the northwest border region between the United States and Canada, spanning Whatcom County and Skagit County, in the United States. The current circulation is 16,000. It was established in 1997 with a bi-weekly distribution and became a weekly in 2003.

Cascadia Weekly became Cascadia Daily News in January of 2022 after 24 years of serving Whatcom County.

References

External links
 

1997 establishments in Washington (state)
Mass media in Bellingham, Washington
Newspapers established in 1997
2021 disestablishments in Washington (state)